Dinesidae is an extinct family of trilobite in the order Corynexochida. There are more than 20 genera and 70 described species in Dinesidae.

Genera
These 25 genera belong to the family Dinesidae:

 Glosspleura
 † Aldanianus Özdikmen, 2006
 † Basocephalus Ivshin, 1952
 † Bonnaspis Resser, 1936
 † Botomella Suvorova, 1958
 † Chakasskinella Repina, 1964
 † Dilataspis Fedjanina, 1999
 † Dinesus Etheridge, 1896
 † Erbia Lermontova, 1940
 † Erbina Pokrovskaya, 1959
 † Erbiopsidella Pokrovskaya, 1959
 † Fieldaspis Rasetti, 1951
 † Fordaspis Lochman, 1956
 † Haydenaspis Peng, Hughes, Heim, Sell, Zhu, Myrow & Parcha, 2009
 † Hemirhodon Raymond, 1937
 † Holteria Walcott, 1924
 † Kootenia Walcott, 1888
 † Lancastria Kobayashi, 1935
 † Mexicaspis Lochman, 1948
 † Notasaphus Gregory, 1903
 † Ogyginus Raymond, 1912
 † Proerbia Lermontova, 1940
 † Pseudoerbia Repina, 1964
 † Rondocephalus Pokrovskaya, 1959
 † Tollaspis Kobayashi, 1935

References

 
Articles created by Qbugbot
Trilobite families